Anna Biedrzycka Sheppard (born 18 January 1946) is a Polish costume designer. Sheppard made many films with directing masters like Steven Spielberg, Roman Polański, and Quentin Tarantino. She has earned three Academy Award for Best Costume Design nominations for Schindler's List (1993), The Pianist (2002), and Maleficent (2014). Recently she has designed costumes for Captain America: The First Avenger (2011), and Spider-Man: Far From Home (2019). She has also designed costumes for the televisions series Band of Brothers (2001), and The Prisoner (2009).

Early life  
Born in 1946 in Poland she is the sister to fellow costume designer Magdalena Biedrzycka. She graduated with architecture from the Academy of Fine Arts in Warsaw and now lives in London.

Career 
She has been nominated three times for the Academy Award for Best Costume Design, Schindler's List in 1993 and The Pianist in 2003, and a third nomination for Maleficent shared with Jane Clive. She was also nominated for a BAFTA Award for Schindler's List and César Award for The Pianist. Sheppard's work with Thomas Casterline on Dragonheart earned her a 1997 Saturn Award nomination as well.

Filmography

Film 
Selected credits:
Schindler's List (1993)
The Pianist (2002)
Around the World in 80 Days (2004)
Fred Claus (2009)
Inglorious Basterds (2009)
Captain America: The First Avenger (2010)
The Book Thief (2013)
Maleficent (2014)
Fury (2014)
Now You See Me 2 (2016)
American Assassin (2017)
Spider-Man: Far From Home (2019)
Eurovision Song Contest: The Story of Fire Saga (2020)

Television 
Band of Brothers (2001)
The Prisoner (2009)

Awards and nominations  
Academy Awards

References

External links

 

1946 births
Living people
Polish costume designers
British people of Polish descent
Women costume designers